Mordechai (Moti) Ben-Ari is a professor emeritus of computer science education at the Weizmann Institute of Science.

Ben-Ari has published numerous textbooks in computer science, developed software tools for teaching Computer Science, and written influential papers in computer science education. His primary focus has been on books and tools for learning theoretical concepts in computer science and mathematics, such as concurrency and mathematical logic.

In collaboration with the University of Joensuu (now part of the University of Eastern Finland) his group developed the Jeliot program animation system for teaching elementary computer science and programming.

He has collaborated with the École Polytechnique Fédérale de Lausanne on educational robotics using the Thymio robot.

Ben-Ari has published two books under the Springer Open Access program:

 Elements of Robotics with Francesco Mondada.
 Mathematical Surprises.

Ben-Ari received ACM SIGCSE Award for Outstanding Contributions for Computer Science Education in 2004, was named an ACM Distinguished Educator in 2009 and received the ACM Karl V. Karlstrom Award in 2019.

References

External links 
Jeliot Program Animation System.
Repositories of pedagogical software and learning materials on GitHub.

Programming language researchers
Israeli computer scientists
Living people
Year of birth missing (living people)
Computer science educators